The Martin Farm is a historic farmhouse at 121 Martin Street in Rehoboth, Massachusetts.  It is a -story Cape style house, four bays wide, with a side gable roof, central chimney, and clapboard siding.  The bays are asymmetrically placed, with the main entrance in the second from the right. The house was built c. 1750–80, and was expanded organically over the next 120 years.  The house was (as of 1983) still in the hands of Martin family descendants.

The house was listed on the National Register of Historic Places in 1983.

See also
National Register of Historic Places listings in Bristol County, Massachusetts

References

Houses completed in 1750
Farms on the National Register of Historic Places in Massachusetts
Buildings and structures in Rehoboth, Massachusetts
National Register of Historic Places in Bristol County, Massachusetts